Hardey may refer to:

Surname
Elliott Hardey (born 1932), Progressive Conservative party member of the House of Commons of Canada
Jemma Hardey, fictitious main character in The Last Albatross by Ian Irvine
Mary Aloysia Hardey, (1809–1886), American religious sister of the Society of the Sacred Heart
Richard Hardey (1844–1910), Australian pastoralist and politician, member of the Legislative Council of Western Australia

Given name
Francis Hardey Faulding (1816–1868), founder of a pharmaceutical company in Adelaide, Australia, in 1845

Geography
Hardey Land District, cadastral division of Western Australia within the North-West Land Division
Hardey River, in the Pilbara region of Western Australia

See also
Hardley (disambiguation)
Hardy (disambiguation)